Vanessa Branson (born 1959) is an English entrepreneur and the founder of the Marrakech Biennale.

Early life
Branson is the youngest child of Eve Branson (née Evette Huntley Flindt; 1924–2021), a former ballet dancer and air hostess, and Edward James "Ted" Branson (1918–2011), a barrister. She was educated at Box Hill School. Her brother is founder of Virgin Group, Richard Branson.

Career
Branson opened and ran the Vanessa Devereux Gallery on Blenheim Crescent in London from 1986 until 1991.  She had married Robert Devereux in 1983 and they had four children before divorcing in 1997.

Between 1999 and 2004, Prue O’Day and Branson curated the Wonderful Fund collection which was first shown at the Museum of Marrackech. Branson is the co-owner of a luxury boutique hotel in Marrakech, El Fenn, which she purchased in 2002 with entrepreneur Howell James. In 2005 she became the president and founder of the Arts in Marrakech Festival, now known as the Marrakech Biennale. In October 2014, Branson was awarded the royal distinction of Officer of the Ouissam Aalouite at the occasion of the ceremony inaugurating the Mohammed VI Museum of Modern and Contemporary Art in Rabat for her contributions to Moroccan arts and culture.

Branson also owns and runs Eilean Shona, an island on the west coast of Scotland at the entrance to Loch Moidart. In collaboration with the Royal Society of Sculptors, a members-only residency has been created — a month-long opportunity for the winning member to live on the island and reflect upon and respond to the natural environment. 

Branson's memoir, One Hundred Summers, was published in May 2020.

References

Further reading

Art dealers from London
Living people
1959 births
English autobiographers
People with dyslexia
People educated at Box Hill School